Tekyeh Aghasht (also Romanized as Tekyeh Āghasht; also known as Tekyeh and Takyeh) is a village in Baraghan Rural District, Chendar District, Savojbolagh County, Alborz Province, Iran. At the 2006 census, its population was 29, in 13 families.

References 

Populated places in Savojbolagh County